Agelanthus nyasicus is a species of hemiparasitic plant in the family Loranthaceae, which is native to Botswana, Malawi, Mozambique, Tanzania, Zambia, Zaïre and Zimbabwe.

Description 
For brief descriptions, see the African Plant database and Govaerts et al. (2018) (based on Polhill & Wiens (2006).
For an image, see Flora of the World.

Habitat/ecology
Agelanthus nyasicus is found at the edges of montane and riverine forest, generally in the higher-rainfall Brachystegia woodland (or miombo woodlands) at altitudes of 100–1900 m. Common hosts are Ficus, Bridelia and various legumes.

References

External links
 JSTOR Global Plants: Agelanthus nyasicus. Accessed 24 March 2018.
 The International Plant Names Index: Agelanthus nyasicus. Accessed 24 March 2018.

Flora of Zambia
Flora of the Democratic Republic of the Congo
Flora of Tanzania
Flora of Zimbabwe
Flora of Botswana
Flora of Malawi
Flora of Mozambique
Plants described in 1910
Taxa named by John Gilbert Baker
Taxa named by Thomas Archibald Sprague